The People's Party of Myanmar Farmers and Workers (PPMFW) is a registered political party in Myanmar (Burma).

The party seeks to represent farmers and workers in Myanmar, and their main goals include compensating those who have lost land to the government, providing new equipment and technical upgrades to farmers, and redistributing corporate and government owned land to "those [farmers] who are actually working on the land."

References

Political parties in Myanmar
Political parties established in 2014
2014 establishments in Myanmar